Francesco Pagliazzi (1910–1988) was an Italian painter born in Reggello, a small comune in the Province of Florence. His subjects ranged from landscape to still-life and portraiture. His works were exhibited in Florence and Milan.

References
Silvestra Bieetoletti. Francesco Pagliazzi, opere 1942–1955. Firenze : Polistampa, 2008.

1910 births
1988 deaths
20th-century Italian painters
Italian male painters
Painters from Florence
20th-century Italian male artists